"All the Way Up" is a hip hop song by American rappers Fat Joe and Remy Ma, featuring American rappers French Montana and Infared. It was released on March 2, 2016 by RNG (Rap's New Generation) and EMPIRE, as the first single from their collaborative album Plata O Plomo. The song was produced by Edsclusive and Cool & Dre and recorded at Diamond District Studios by Dwayne Shippy iLL Wayno in New York City, New York. At the 59th Grammy Awards, it was nominated for Best Rap Performance and Best Rap Song.

Music video 
The song's accompanying music video premiered on March 26, 2016 on Fat Joe's YouTube account on Vevo. Remy Ma's husband Papoose, DJ Khaled, Fred The Godson and Farid Bang make cameo appearances in the video.

Chart performance 
The song peaked at number 27 on the US Billboard Hot 100. It is Fat Joe's first top 40 hit since his 2007 hit "I Won't Tell", featuring J. Holiday, as well as the only top 40 for Remy Ma as a solo artist and French Montana's second biggest hit. In France, "All the Way Up" has peaked at number 85, becoming Fat Joe's first chart entry in that country since 2002's "What's Luv?", featuring Ashanti. In February 2021, the song was certified triple platinum by the Recording Industry Association of America (RIAA) for combined sales and streaming equivalent units of over three million copies in the United States.

Track listing 
Digital download
"All the Way Up" (Explicit)  — 3:11

Digital download (Remix)
"All the Way Up" (Remix)  — 4:44

Digital download (EDM Remix)
"All the Way Up" (EDM Remix)  — 3:31

Digital download (Westside Remix)
"All the Way Up" (Westside Remix)  — 5:17

Digital download (Asian Remix)
"All the Way Up" (Asian Remix)  — 4:50

YouTube stream (BangerMusik Remix)
"All the Way Up" (BangerMusik Remix)  — 2:54

Remixes 
The official remix features new verses by Fat Joe and Remy Ma, including an additional verse by Jay Z. Rappers Meek Mill, Fabolous and Jadakiss also recorded a remix to the song. Rapper Papoose, who is also the spouse of Remy Ma, recorded a freestyle as well. An official remix by David Guetta and GLOWINTHEDARK was released on May 27, 2016. A Westside remix was released, featuring Snoop Dogg, The Game and E-40. A reggaeton remix is in the works which will feature Fat Joe, Daddy Yankee and Nicky Jam. In addition, a German "BangerMusik" remix with Farid Bang, Summer Cem, Kollegah and Seyed, was released. The Asian remix was released, featuring Jay Park, AK-69, DaboyWay, SonaOne and Joe Flizzow.

Charts

Weekly charts

Year-end charts

Certifications

Release history

References

External links 

2016 songs
2016 singles
Fat Joe songs
Remy Ma songs
Songs written by Fat Joe
French Montana songs
Songs written by French Montana
Song recordings produced by Cool & Dre
Songs written by Dre (record producer)
Songs written by Remy Ma
Empire Distribution singles